This article contains episode information and plot summaries from the British television programme Balamory. Season Two was broadcast on 7 April 2003. The main cast are listed on the main Balamory page.

Episodes 

2002 Scottish television seasons
Balamory